"Bop Gun (One Nation)" is the third single from American rapper, actor and filmmaker Ice Cube's fourth album, Lethal Injection. It samples the Funkadelic song "One Nation Under a Groove". It reached number six on the Billboard Hot Rap Singles chart and number 23 on the Billboard Pop Singles chart. The song features lyrics from Tom Tom Club's hit "Genius of Love."

The song was included on Ice Cube's Greatest Hits album and on the 1996 George Clinton remix album Greatest Funkin' Hits. "Bop Gun (One Nation)" was mixed at Aire LA Studios in Glendale, CA by Raymundo Silva.

The version of "Bop Gun (One Nation)" featured on Lethal Injection is about 11 minutes, while the radio edit clocks in at under four minutes. The radio edit also features slightly different lyrics sung by Ice Cube, such as the replacement of certain expletives, so as to make it more suitable for radio play.

Background
The term "Bop Gun" was invented and popularized by George Clinton's band Parliament in the 1977 song "Bop Gun (Endangered Species)". It is "shot" at the funkless people and fills their heart with funk and enlightenment from false ideology. (George Clinton's Funkcyclopedia)

Music video
The video for the single portrays a crazy houseparty at George Clinton's, was directed by Cameron Casey and also features Bootsy Collins and WC. In the ending, the music stops with a fadeout and we can finally catch George Clinton holding the Bop Gun.

Charts and certifications

Weekly charts

Year-end charts

Certifications

References

Ice Cube songs
1993 songs
1994 singles
Songs written by Ice Cube
Songs written by George Clinton (funk musician)
G-funk songs
Priority Records singles